Jonas Sela (born January 23, 1984 in Bensberg) is a German football player, he is a goalkeeper for SC Fortuna Köln.

Career 
He spent two seasons in the Bundesliga with 1. FSV Mainz 05.

References

External links
 Official Pizco.com Site
 Profile at FSV 05.de - Online-Archiv des 1. FSV Mainz 05

1984 births
Living people
German footballers
SC Fortuna Köln players
1. FSV Mainz 05 players
MVV Maastricht players
Association football goalkeepers
Bundesliga players